Mohammed Bosun Lawal (born 30 May 2003) is an Irish professional footballer who plays for Celtic, as a defender and midfielder.

Club career
Lawal started his football career with the joint youth setup of Irish sides St. Kevin's Boys and Bohemian, playing for the latter at under-19 level. He joined English Premier League side Watford in 2019.

While at Watford, he was named academy player of the year for the 2020–21 season, and earned praise from then-first team captain Troy Deeney, who compared him to Abdoulaye Doucouré. He was offered a one-year contract by Watford in May 2021, but had attracted interest from Chelsea, Fulham, Norwich City and Scottish side Celtic, with the latter showing the strongest interest.

Having rejected the contract offer from Watford, Lawal made the move to Scotland, joining Celtic in July 2021. He was assigned to the club's B team, where he impressed with his performances, and was linked with a transfer away from the club in December 2022.

He was named on the bench for the first team for the first time as Celtic went on to beat St Johnstone 4–1. He made his senior debut on 21 January 2023, coming on as a late substitute in a 5–0 Scottish Cup win against Greenock Morton.

International career
Lawal has represented the Republic of Ireland from under-15 to under-21 level.

Personal life
Lawal was born in Ireland and is of Nigerian descent. His brother, Ola, is also a professional footballer and currently plays for Falkirk.

References

2003 births
Living people
Irish people of Nigerian descent
Republic of Ireland association footballers
Republic of Ireland youth international footballers
St. Kevin's Boys F.C. players
Bohemian F.C. players
Watford F.C. players
Celtic F.C. players
Lowland Football League players
Association football defenders
Association football midfielders